"Please Don't Say You Love Me" is a song by British singer-songwriter Gabrielle Aplin. It was released as the second single from her debut studio album, English Rain (2013). It was released as a digital download in the  United Kingdom on 10 February 2013 and reached number six on the UK Singles Chart. In 2014 the song was released in Australia, where it debuted and peaked at number three on the ARIA Singles Chart, becoming Aplin's highest-charting single there. It is currently certified Gold in the United Kingdom and Platinum in Australia.

Composition
"Please Don't Say You Love Me" was written and composed in 2012 by Aplin and Nicholas Atkinson. Sheet music shows that "Please Don't Say You Love Me" is set in the key of C Major. It is written in 2/2 time with a slow tempo of 86 beats per minute. Aplin's vocals span from A3 to C5.

Music video
A music video to accompany the release of "Please Don't Say You Love Me" was first released onto YouTube on 27 July 2012 at a total length of three minutes and twenty-eight seconds, starring Agents of SHIELD's Iain De Caestecker and the actress Ophelia Lovibond. It was filmed in and around The Five Horseshoes in Maidensgrove, Oxfordshire.

Usage
An acoustic version of "Please Don`t Say You Love Me" was featured in the closing episode of Channel 4 soap Hollyoaks on 19 April 2013 when it was used during the exit of popular character Jacqui McQueen.

Although it was released in 2013, "Please Don't Say You Love Me" debuted at number three on the ARIA Charts on 28 July 2014, after Rachael Thompson performed it in her audition for The X Factor Australia.

Track listings

Charts

Weekly charts

Year-end charts

Certifications

Release history

References

2013 singles
2013 songs
EMI Records singles
Folk ballads
Gabrielle Aplin songs
Parlophone singles
Songs written by Gabrielle Aplin
Songs written by Nick Atkinson